Haneef Adeni (born 30 June 1987) is an Indian film director and screenwriter, who works in Malayalam cinema. Haneef made his directorial debut in the 2017 film The Great Father. His next venture as a screenwriter is Ameer, starring Mammooty.

Personal life
Haneef Adeni was born on 30 June 1987 in Thrissur, Kerala, India. He is currently residing in Kochi, Kerala, India.

Career
Haneef Adeni's debut movie was The Great Father starring Mammootty in the lead. The film released on 30 March 2017 and was commercial success. It grossed $960,748 from UAE box office in two weeks. Abrahaminte Santhathikal, his next film as a writer was a production of Goodwill Entertainments and was announced on 7 September 2017 by producer Joby George on Mammootty's birthday. It was the directorial debut of Shaji Padoor, an associate director in Malayalam cinema for 22 years. The movie was released on 16 June 2018 in Kerala. It was released in Gulf countries on 21 June and in rest of India the following day. The Times of India and International Business Times gave the film positive reviews. On 12 July 2018, he announced his second directorial film Mikhael produced by Anto Joseph under the banner Anto Joseph Film Company. It was released in theaters on 18 January 2019.

Filmography

References

External links
 
 

Malayalam film directors
Malayali people
1987 births
Living people
Film directors from Kochi
Malayalam screenwriters
21st-century Indian film directors
21st-century Indian dramatists and playwrights
Screenwriters from Kochi
21st-century Indian screenwriters